Reichenbach's sunbird (Anabathmis reichenbachii) is a species of bird in the family Nectariniidae.
It is found in Angola, Cameroon, Central African Republic, Republic of the Congo, Democratic Republic of the Congo, Ivory Coast, Gabon, Ghana, Liberia, and Nigeria.

The bird is named after the German botanist and zoologist Heinrich Ludwig Reichenbach.

References

External links
Image at ADW

Reichenbach's sunbird
Reichenbach's sunbird
Taxonomy articles created by Polbot